Manraj Singh Johal (born 12 October 2001) is an English cricketer. Johal studied at Sandwell College and Oldbury Academy, and played age group cricket with Warwickshire from the U-11s onwards. He also played minor league cricket for Staffordshire. In October 2020, he signed a professional contract with Warwickshire. He made his List A debut on 22 July 2021, for Warwickshire in the 2021 Royal London One-Day Cup.

Johal made his first-class debut on 28 September 2021, for Warwickshire in the 2021 Bob Willis Trophy, the final of the 2021 County Championship.

References

External links
 

2001 births
Living people
English cricketers
Staffordshire cricketers
Warwickshire cricketers
Cricketers from Birmingham, West Midlands